Juan Felipe de Jesús Nakpil, KGCR (born Juan Felipe Nakpil y de Jesús; May 26, 1899 – May 7, 1986) known as Juan Nakpil, was a Filipino architect, teacher and a community leader. In 1973, he was named one of the National Artists for architecture. He was regarded as the Dean of Filipino Architects.

Early life
He was the eighth child of the Philippine Revolution veterans Julio Nakpil and Gregoria de Jesús (who married the former after the death of her first husband Andrés Bonifacio).

Education
He studied engineering at the University of California and later, at the University of Kansas, where he received his bachelor's degree in Mechanical Engineering. He then studied architecture at the Fontainebleau School of Fine Arts in France upon the recommendation of Jean Jacques Haffner, one of his professors at the Harvard Graduate School of Architecture.

Career
Nakpil worked at Andres Luna de San Pedro's architectural firm (1928) and at Don Gonzalo Puyat & Sons, opening his own architectural firm in 1930. Among Nakpil's works are San Carlos Seminary, Geronimo de los Reyes Building, Iglesia ni Cristo Riverside Locale (Now F. Manalo, San Juan) and Iglesia Ni Cristo - Locale of Caloocan, Magsaysay Building, Rizal Theater, Capitol Theater, Captain Pepe Building, Manila Jockey Club, Rufino Building, Philippine Village Hotel, University of the Philippines Administration and University Library, and the Rizal Shrine in Calamba, Laguna. He also designed the International Eucharistic Congress altar and improved the Quiapo Church in 1930 by erecting a dome and a second belfry. The church burned down in 1929 prior to Nakpil's redesign of the building. In the 1930s to the 1940s, Nakpil and his fellow architects Andres Luna de San Pedro, Fernando Ocampo and Pablo Antonio started the period of modern architecture in the Philippines. Nakpil and others also established the Philippine College of Design in 1941 but the institution did not survive the Second World War. In 1952, President Quirino appointed Nakpil to be a member of the National Rizal Day Committee. He was hailed as a National Artist for Architecture in 1973. On November 23, 1936, Nakpil was on a list of Inactive Philippine Army Officers as an Infantry Major.

Nakpil and his family company Juan F. Nakpil & Sons, together with the contractors United Construction Company, Inc. were part of the most prominent landmark case for fortuitous events filed by the Philippine Bar Association (PBA). The PBA through its counsel, the Jose W. Diokno Law Office, which was represented by Sen. Diokno himself, won the case against Nakpil in the trial court, which was just affirmed in the Court of Appeals and later elevated to the Supreme Court. Nakpil lost that final case in 1986, and was liable for damages to the PBA, whose building was destroyed during an earthquake way back in 1968.

Projects

Theaters
Gaiety Theater, Manila (now inactive)
Rizal Theater (since demolished; the site is occupied by Makati Shangri-La, Manila)
Capitol Theater (now inactive)
University of the Philippines Theater and carillon tower

Other buildings
Arellano University Building
Boy Scouts of the Philippines (BSP) National Headquarters
Philippine Trust Co. Building (at what is now Plaza Lacson)
Geronimo Delos Reyes Building
Capitan Pepe Building
Manila Jockey Club
San Carlos Seminary
Philippine Village Hotel (closed in 2000)
University of the Philippines Administration & Library
Rizal Shrine
Gala-Rodriguez Ancestral House
University of the Philippines Los Baños Old Humanities Building
 Philippine National Bank building - Visayas

Special Projects 

Main Altar for the Second National Eucharistic Congress of the Philippines

Personal life and family
Nakpil married Anita Agoncillo Noble, who came from Lemery, Batangas. Noble was the granddaughter of Doña Marcela Mariño Agoncillo and became the first Miss Philippines after the Manila Carnival Queen was reimagined as Miss Philippines in 1926.

The two had three sons, namely Ariston, Francisco, Eulogio, and two daughters, namely Annie, and Edith. The three sons later became architects and joined Nakpil in the family firm, which was renamed Juan F. Nakpil & Sons, and later renamed Nakpil, Nakpil, Nakpil, and Nakpil in 1972.

In the 1970s, Ariston Roman Nakpil, alongside fifteen other professional founded the Chamber of Real Estate and Builders' Associations (CREBA), a non-government, umbrella organization of firms and professionals involved in real estate and real property. Annie Tañada married Renato "Nats" Tañada, son of former Senator and "father of Philippine politics", Lorenzo Tañada. Both Annie and Renato were posthumously honored as "patriot-members" of the Ninoy Aquino Movement on the 29th death anniversary of Benigno Aquino Jr. in 2012. Edith Nakpil-Rabat was crowned Miss Philippines in 1955 and later served as a member of the Batasang Pambanasa under the Marcos regime. She married Davao Oriental governor Francisco Rabat and was known as the "First Lady of Davao".

Nakpil died on May 7, 1986, aged 87. He was arranged a state funeral and was buried at the Manila North Cemetery.

Awards 
:
: National Artist of the Philippines (1973)
: Presidential Medal of Merit (1955)
  Supreme Commander and Knight Grand Cross of the Order of the Knights of Rizal

References

External links
 Juan Nakpil's page at the Philippine National Commission for Culture and the Arts

 01
National Artists of the Philippines
1899 births
1986 deaths
People from Quiapo, Manila
Burials at the Manila North Cemetery
University of the Philippines alumni
University of Kansas alumni
Art Deco architects
20th-century Filipino people
20th-century Filipino architects
Harvard Graduate School of Design alumni
Recipients of the Presidential Medal of Merit (Philippines)